Nuestra Belleza Latina 2016 (stylized as NBL VIP) was the tenth season of Nuestra Belleza Latina aired on Univision. It was the first "All Star" season from the entire series. The season premiered on Sunday February 28, 2016 pushed back from previous season premiering in January. The season finale was on May 22, 2016.

There were no auditions this season as this season has been subtitled "All Stars", featuring twenty-six returning non-winning contestants representing the shows nine seasons for a second chance to win the title. Twenty-six of the most cutthroat, controversial and diverse contestants will battle for redemption to make it to the top. Clarissa Molina from Dominican Republic was crowned the 2016 NBL VIP Queen

Casting & Changes
This is the first ever "All Star" season of the entire show featuring twenty-six returning non-winning semifinalist  representing all nine Seasons for a second chance to win the title. The top 12 will have the privilege to get back to the competition. This season will not feature a luxurious "Beauty Mansion" like previous seasons but rather a "Farm House"  where all twelve "All Stars" must show they have what it takes to make it to the top. Setareh Khatibi from NBL 2012 (Season 6), Josephine Ochoa from NBL 2014 (Season 8) and Nathalia Casco from NBL 2015 (Season 9) are the only Runner-Up contestants selected to compete from all nine previous seasons. No casting process will be shown prior to the first gala. There will be two shows showing highlights of the contestants in their previous season and what they have been doing since their season, the pool of twenty-six will be reduced to twenty then to twelve. For the first time this season will be completely interactive and the public will be able to decide which girls they want back into the competition, what challenges they want the girls to do and what photo-shoots they should do. In addition to Head Judge Osmel Sousa, and beauty queen turned actress and TV Host Jaqueline Bracamontes there is a new judge this season. Colombian Actor and India Catalina Awards nominee Best Actor Daniel Arenas will be joining the panel of judges. The backstage segment called "Rincon Social" will be hosted by Nuestra Belleza Latina 2015 winner, Francisca Lachapel, who will interview the guest, contestants and present what social media is saying about the show. For the first time since NBL 2012 (Season 6) the title sequence will be changed and for the first time since the original season NBL 2007 (Season 1) the logo of the show is revamped and re-titled NBL VIP. For the final twelve, more than one contestant from the same season can be chosen to compete and a season may also have no representative. The age requirement of 27 has been dropped since some previous contestants are over the previous age limit.

2016 All-Star Contestants

Elimination chart 

{| class="wikitable" style="text-align:center;  font-size:85%"
|-
| colspan="3" style="text-align:right;"|Stage:
| colspan="10" style="background:orchid; text-align:Center;"|Finalists
| style="background:plum; text-align:Center;"|Semi-Final
| style="background:Red; text-align:Center;"|Finale
|-
| colspan="3" style="text-align:right;"|Week:
|  style="text-align:center; width:7%;"|1
|  style="text-align:center; width:7%;"|2
|  style="text-align:center; width:7%;"|3 
|  style="text-align:center; width:7%;"|4
|  style="text-align:center; width:7%;"|5
|  style="text-align:center; width:6%;"|6
|  style="text-align:center; width:6%;"|7
|  style="text-align:center; width:6%;"|8
|  style="text-align:center; width:6%;"|9
|  style="text-align:center; width:7%;"|10
|  style="text-align:center; width:6%;"|11
|  style="text-align:center; width:7%;"|12
|-
! style="text-align:center; width:2%;"|Place
| style="text-align:center; width:2%;"|Country
! style="text-align:center; width:12.5%;"|Contestants
! colspan="13" style="text-align:center;"|Results
|-
| style="text-align:center; background:deeppink;"| 1st
| 
| Clarissa Molina 
|style="background:teal;"|Group 2
| Top 12 
| Safe 
| style="background:pink; width;"|Safe 
| Safe 
| style="background:goldenrod; text-align:center;"|Won
| style="background:goldenrod; text-align:center;"|Won
| style="background:lightblue; text-align:center;|Bottom 3
| style="background:mediumpurple; text-align:center;|Top 6
| Safe
| Safe 
| style="text-align:center; background:deeppink;"| Winner
|- 
| style="text-align:center; background:cyan;"| 2nd
| 
|Setareh Khatibi
| style="background:lightgreen;"|Group 1
| style="background:pink; width;"|Top 12 
| Safe 
| style="background:goldenrod; text-align:center;"|Won 
| style="background:#8ab8e6; text-align:center;|Bottom 2
| Safe 
| style="background:goldenrod; text-align:center;"|Won
| style="background:#8ab8e6; text-align:center;|Bottom 2 
| style="background:mediumpurple; text-align:center;|Top 6
| style="background:goldenrod; text-align:center;"|Won
| Safe 
| style="text-align:center; background:cyan;"| Runner-Up
|-
| style="text-align:center; background:palegoldenrod;"| 3rd
| 
| Catherine Castro
| style="background:lightgreen;"|Group 1
| Top 12 
| style="background:lightblue; text-align:center;|Bottom 3
| style="background:goldenrod; text-align:center;"|Won 
| style="background:#e0f0ff; text-align:center;|Bottom 4
| style="background:lightblue; text-align:center;|Bottom 3
| style="background:goldenrod; text-align:center;"|Won
| style="background:goldenrod; text-align:center;"|Won 
| style="background:mediumpurple; text-align:center;|Top 6
| Safe
| style="background:#8ab8e6; text-align:center;|Bottom 2
| style="text-align:center; background:palegoldenrod;"| 3rd Place
|-
| style="text-align:center; background:palegoldenrod;"| 4th
| 
| Bárbara Turbay
| style="background:lightgreen;"|Group 1
| Top 12 
| Safe 
| style="background:lightblue; text-align:center;"|Bottom 3 
| Safe 
| Safe 
| style="background:goldenrod; text-align:center;"|Won 
| style="background:goldenrod; text-align:center;"|Won 
| style="background:mediumpurple; text-align:center;|Top 6
| style="background:lightblue; text-align:center;"|Bottom 3
| style="background:pink; width;"|Safe 
| style="text-align:center; background:palegoldenrod;"|4th Place
|- 
| style="text-align:center; background:palegoldenrod;"|5th
| 
| Ligia De Uriarte
| style="background:teal;"|Group 2
| Top 12 
|  style="background:pink;"|Safe 
| Safe  
| style="background:goldenrod; text-align:center;"|Won 
| Safe 
| style="background:lightblue; text-align:center;|Bottom 3
| style="background:goldenrod; text-align:center;"|Won 
| style="background:mediumpurple; text-align:center;|Top 6
| style="background:#8ab8e6; text-align:center;|Bottom 2
| style="text-align:center; background:palegoldenrod"|5th Place 
| style="background:lightgreen; text-align:center;"|Guest
|-
| style="text-align:center; background:palegoldenrod;"|6th
| 
| Patricia Corcino
| style="background:lightgreen;"|Group 1
| Top 12 
| Safe 
| style="background:goldenrod; text-align:center;"|Won
| Safe 
| Safe 
| style="background:#8ab8e6; text-align:center;|Bottom 2
| style="background:goldenrod; text-align:Center;"|8th Place
| style="background:pink; text-align:center;|Top 6
| style="background:orange; text-align:Center;"|6th Place
| colspan="1" style="background:#ccc; text-align:center;"|
| style="background:lightgreen; text-align:center;"|Guest
|-
| style="text-align:center; background:palegoldenrod;"|7th
| style="background:white; text-align:center;"|
| style="background:white; text-align:center;"|Josephine Ochoa
| style="background:lightgreen;"|Group 1
| style="text-align:center; background:yellow;"|Nominated
| Safe 
| Safe 
| Safe 
| style="background:#8ab8e6; text-align:center;|Bottom 2
| style="background:goldenrod; text-align:center;"|Won 
| style="background:#8ab8e6; text-align:center;|Bottom 2
| style="background:palegoldenrod; text-align:Center;"|7th Place
| colspan="2" style="background:#ccc; text-align:center;"|Eliminated
| style="background:lightgreen; text-align:center;"|Guest
|-
| style="text-align:center; background:palegoldenrod;"|8th
| style="background:white; text-align:center;"| 
| style="background:white; text-align:center;"| Nathalia Casco
|style="background:teal;"|Group 2
| Top 12 
| Safe 
| style="background:#8ab8e6; text-align:center;|Bottom 2
| style="background:#e0f0ff; text-align:center;|Bottom 4
| style="background:lightblue; text-align:center;|Bottom 3 
| style="background:#8ab8e6; text-align:center;|Bottom 2 
| style="background:crimson; text-align:Center;"|Quit
| colspan="9" style="background:#ccc; text-align:center;"|Resigned
|-
| style="text-align:center; background:palegoldenrod;"|9th
| style="background:white; text-align:center;"|
| style="background:white; text-align:center;"|Zolia Ceballos
| style="background:lightgreen;"|Group 1
| Top 12 
| Safe 
| style="background:goldenrod; text-align:center;"|Won 
| style="background:goldenrod; text-align:center;"|Won 
| style="background:#8ab8e6; text-align:center;|Bottom 2
| style="text-align:center; background:palegoldenrod;"|9th Place
| style="background:lightgreen; text-align:center;"|Guest
| colspan="8" style="background:#ccc; text-align:center;"|Eliminated
|-
| style="text-align:center; background:palegoldenrod;"|10th
| style="background:white; text-align:center;"|
| style="background:white; text-align:center;"|Anna Valencia
|style="background:teal;"|Group 2
| Top 12 
| style="background:goldenrod; text-align:center;"|Won
| style="background:goldenrod; text-align:center;"|Won 
| style="background:#8ab8e6; text-align:center;|Bottom 2
| style="background:palegoldenrod; text-align:Center;"|10th Place
| colspan="5" style="background:#ccc; text-align:center;"|Eliminated
| style="background:lightgreen; text-align:center;"|Guest
|-
| style="text-align:center; background:palegoldenrod;"|11th
| style="background:white; text-align:center;"|
| style="background:white; text-align:center;"|Berenice Guzmán 
|style="background:teal;"|Group 2
| Top 12 
| style="background:#8ab8e6; text-align:center;|Bottom 2
| style="background:goldenrod; text-align:center;|Bottom 2
| style="background:palegoldenrod; text-align:Center;"|11th Place
| colspan="11" style="background:#ccc; text-align:center;"|Eliminated
|-
| style="text-align:center; background:palegoldenrod;"|12th
| style="background:white; text-align:center;"|
| style="background:white; text-align:center;"|Lisandra Silva 
|style="background:teal;"|Group 2
| Top 12 
| style="background:#8ab8e6; text-align:center;|Bottom 2
| style="background:palegoldenrod; text-align:Center;"|12th Place
| colspan="12" style="background:#ccc; text-align:center;"|Eliminated
|-
| style="text-align:center; background:turquoise;"|13th
| style="background:white; text-align:center;"|
| style="background:white; text-align:center;"|Karol Scott 
| style="background:lightgreen;"|Group 1 
| style="text-align:center; background:yellow;"|Nominated
| style="background:turquoise; text-align:Center;"|13th Place
| colspan="12" style="background:#ccc; text-align:center;"|Eliminated
|}

 Countries being represented 

 Eliminated
 First Place
 Winner
 Runner-Up
 CPW: Countries Previously won
 R : Resigned
 : Countries Previously won

Episodes
Season 10, Episode 0: The Queens are Back
Original Air Date—21 February 2016
Seven of the previous winners of Nuestra Belleza Latina sit down with Lourdes Stephen and Jomari Goyso to discuss their triumphs, obstacles and what they think of the ladies returning. 
Guest Hosts: Fashion Guru & Beauty Expert Jomari Goyso, anchor and moderator for Sal y Pimienta Lourdes Stephen
Guest Appearances:  "The Czar of Beauty" and Head Judge Osmel Sousa, First Winner of Nuestra Belleza Latina (NBL 2007) Alejandra Espinoza, Winner of NBL 2010 Ana Patricia Gonzalez, Winner of NBL 2011 Nastassja Bolívar, Winner of NBL 2012 Vanessa De Roide, Winner of NBL 2013 Marisela Demontecristo, Winner of NBL 2014 Aleyda Ortiz, current Winner of NBL 2015 Francisca Lachapel

Season 10, Episode 1: Season of Redemption
Original Air Date—28 February 2016
Group one of 14 "All★Stars" arrives to Miami beginning the toughest competition. Highlights of their best moments and failures of their season shown. As well as what they have been up to since their last appearance on their original season. The girls were divided into seven total pairs, showing their talents from singing, acting, hosting or dancing.

Guest Appearances:  First Winner of NBL 2007 Alejandra Espinoza, Winner of NBL 2011 Nastassja Bolívar, current Winner of NBL 2015 Francisca Lachapel
Musical Guest: Puerto Rican reggaeton musician Yandel, Cuban-American Rapper Pitbull and Cuban reggaeton musician "El Chacal" 
Challenge Guest: journalist & award-winning anchor Enrique Acevedo, TV host Carlos Calderón

CR stands for Country Representing
Rank stands for original placement on original season

Season 10, Episode 2: Last Chance 
Original Air Date—6 March 2016
Group two of the last ten contestants will arrive to Miami in the hopes of making it to the competition. Highlights of their best moments and failures of their season shown. As well as what they have been up to since their last appearance on their original season. The girls were divided into seven total pairs, showing their talents from singing, acting, hosting or dancing. The final two girls that will form the top 26 will be revealed to the public. 
 
Musical Guest: Dominican singer-songwriter Prince Royce, Mexican songwriter & composer Espinoza Paz
Quit the competition:   Prissila Sanchez

CR stands for Country Representing
Rank stands for original placement on original season

Season 10, Episode 3: All Stars Chosen 
Original Air Date—13 March 2016
The first 5 contestants with the lowest votes will be eliminated. The top 20 will have a challenge chosen by the judges. Only the Top 12 will move on to the next stage of the competition and move into the "Mansion de la Belleza" (Mansion of Beauty) as they get one step closer to becoming the first All Star winner.

First Call-Out (At the Final Runway):   Setareh Khatibi
Guest Appearances: Former Nuestra Belleza Latina Judge Julian Gil, Noticiero Univision Edición Nocturna anchor Ilia Calderón
Musical Guest: Puerto Rican reggaeton singer Farruko(ages stated are at time of contest)Season 10, Episode 4: Back to Basics 
Original Air Date—20 March 2016
The finalists move into the Mansion with a twist. NBL Camp will be the temporary place for the finalists, they will need to earn their stay at the Mansion. Tensions rise as the pressure start. The final girl chosen to be the final 12th All Star was  Josephine Ochoa.

First Call-Out (At the Final Runway):   Ligia De Uriarte 
Nominated by the Judges:  Lisandra Silva,  Catherine Castro and  Berenice Guzman
Saved by Fellow Contestants:  Catherine Castro
Nominees of the week:   Lisandra Silva and  Berenice Guzman 
Challenge Winner:  Anna Valencia
Guest Appearances: Eugenio Debrez
Musical Guest: Boy-Band and La Banda Winners CNCO, Mexican Singer "El Dasa"

Season 10, Episode 5: First Star down 
Original Air Date—27 March 2016
The first elimination and challenge took place as the first All Star left the competition.
First Call-Out (At the Final Runway):   Clarissa Molina
Nominees of previous Week:  Berenice Guzman and  Lisandra Silva 
Eliminated from the Competition:  Lisandra Silva from NBL ★ 2015 (Season 9)
Challenge Winner: Pink Team ( Setareh Khatibi,  Catherine Castro,  Berenice Guzman,  Zoila Ceballos,  Anna Valencia, and  Patricia Corcino)
Nominated by Judges:  Nathalia Casco,  Barbara Turbay and  Berenice Guzman
Saved by Fellow Contestants:  Barbara Turbay
Nominees of the week:  Nathalia Casco and  Berenice Guzman
Musical Guest: Regional Mexican Singer Roberto Tapia, Venezuelan Pop Duo Chino & Nacho

Season 10, Episode 6: Staying on Top 
Original Air Date—3 April 2016
The second elimination and challenge took place as the second All Star left the competition.
First Call-Out (At the Final Runway):  Zoila Ceballos
Nominees from Previous Week:  Berenice Guzmán and  Nathalia Casco
Eliminated from the Competition:  Berenice Guzmán from NBL ★ 2009 (Season 3)
Nominated by Judges:  Catherine Castro,  Nathalia Casco,  Setareh Khatibi and  Anna Valencia 
Saved by Fellow Contestants:  Catherine Castro &  Nathalia Casco
Nominees of the week:  Setareh Khatibi and  Anna Valencia 
Challenge Winner:  Zoila Ceballos and  Ligia de Uriarte
Musical Guest: Chiquis and Plan B

Season 10, Episode 7: Back to the Beauty Mansion 
Original Air Date—10 April 2016
The third elimination and challenge will take place as the third All Star leaves the competition, as the girls try getting back into the Mansion and leave NBL Camp for good. 
First Call-Out (At the Final Runway):    Clarissa Molina
Nominees from Previous Week:  Setareh Khatibi and  Anna Valencia 
Eliminated from the Competition:  Anna Valencia from NBL ★ 2009 (Season 3)
Automatically Nominated:  Zoila Ceballos  
Nominated by Fellow Contestants:  Catherine Castro &  Nathalia Casco
Saved by Judges:  Catherine Castro &  Nathalia Casco
Nominated by Judges:  Josephine Ochoa
Nominees of the week:  Zoila Ceballos & Josephine Ochoa
Challenge Winner:  Clarissa Molina 
Guest Appearances: Alejandra Espinosa
Musical Guest: Actor & Singer Diego Boneta and Mexican singer Régulo Caro.

Season 10, Episode 8: Beauty Lip Sync Battle 
Original Air Date—17 April 2016
The fourth elimination and challenge will take place as the next All Star leaves the competition. As one All Star moves back into the NBL Camp for insubordination the remaining queens are trying to get back into the Mansion and leave NBL Camp for good. 
First Call-Out (At the Final Runway):  Bárbara Turbay
Nominees from Previous Week:  Zoila Ceballos &  Josephine Ochoa
Eliminated from the Competition:  Zoila Ceballos from NBL ★ 2008 (Season 2)
Nominated by Judges:  Ligia De Uriarte,  Nathalia Casco and  Patricia Corcino
Saved by Judges:  Ligia De Uriarte
Nominees of the week:  Nathalia Casco and  Patricia Corcino
Camp Challenge Winners:  Catherine Castro &  Patricia Corcino
Lip Sync Challenge Winners:   Josephine Ochoa,  Setareh Khatibi,  Bárbara Turbay,  Clarissa Molina,  Catherine Castro &  Zoila Ceballos
Huntsman Movie Challenge Winners:  Ligia De Uriarte,  Setareh Khatibi,  Clarissa Molina &  Catherine Castro 
Guest Appearances: Alejandra Espinosa, Fedro helping Bárbara Turbay in challenge
Musical Guest: Mexican Banda Group "Calibre 50", Puerto Rican  reggaeton duo Alexis & Fido

Season 10, Episode 9: Goodbye to the Farm House 
Original Air Date—24 April 2016
The remaining girls move back into the Beauty Mansion. Tensions arise after a shocking nomination. The fight elimination and challenge will take place as the next All Star leaves the competition. As they battle to make it to the upcoming quarter-finals of the competition. After a shocking elimination, Nathalia Casco decided to leave the competition voluntarily stating her emotional and mental sanity was her priority over the competition, leaving her spot for fellow contestant Patricia Corcino. 
First Call-Out (At the Final Runway):   Ligia De Uriarte
Nominees from Previous Week:  Nathalia Casco and  Patricia Corcino
Eliminated from the Competition:  Patricia Corcino from NBL ★ 2011 (Season 5)
Quit from the Competition:  Nathalia Casco from NBL ★ 2015 (Season 9)
Reinstated to the Competition:  Patricia Corcino from NBL ★ 2011 (Season 5)
Nominated by Judges:  Josephine Ochoa,  Setareh Khatibi,  Clarissa Molina and  Nathalia Casco 
Saved by Judges:  Clarissa Molina
Nominees of the week:  Josephine Ochoa and  Setareh Khatibi
Live Show Challenge Winner:  Bárbara Turbay,  Catherine Castro,  Ligia de Uriarte and  Patricia Corcino
Guest Appearances: Mexican Actress, Marlene Favela  & previous participant  Zoila Ceballos
Musical Guest: Puerto Rican reggaeton music duo Zion & Lennox, Regional Mexican singer Luis Coronel, Colombian reggaeton singer Reykon

Season 10, Episode 10: Major Revelations  
Original Air Date—1 May 2016 The top seven girls open up with major revelations of hardships of their past. As the finale awaits, a shocking twist throws stirs up the competition. As the sixth All Star leaves the competition, the girls are one step closer to the finals. 
First Call-Out (At the Final Runway):  Patricia Corcino
Nominees from Previous Week:   Josephine Ochoa and  Setareh Khatibi
Eliminated from the Competition:  Josephine Ochoa from NBL ★ 2014 (Season 8)
Challenge Winner of the week: No Challenge winner was determined
Final Judges Nominations:  Setareh Khatibi,  Ligia De Uriarte,  Catherine Castro,  Clarissa Molina,  Barbara Turbay, and  Patricia Corcino
Musical Guest: Cuban actor & singer Jencarlos Canela, Mexican pop band Reik, Cuban reggaeton singer Jacob Forever

Season 10, Episode 11: Road to the Finale 
Original Air Date—8 May 2016 The seventh elimination and challenge take place as the seventh All Star leaves the competition.

First Call-Out (At the Runway):  Setareh Khatibi
Nominees from Previous Week:  Clarissa Molina, Catherine Castro,  Ligia De Uriarte,  Barbara Turbay,  Patricia Corcino, and  Setareh Khatibi
Nominees having fewest public vote:  Barbara Turbay,  Ligia De Uriarte, and  Patricia Corcino
Saved by Judges:  Barbara Turbay
Saved by Fellow Contestants:  Ligia Uriate
Eliminated from the Competition:   Patricia Corcino from NBL ★ 2011 (Season 5)
Challenge Winner of the week:  Setareh Khatibi
Final Judges Nominations:  Barbara Turbay,  Catherine Castro,  Setareh Khatibi,  Ligia De Uriarte, and  Clarissa Molina.
Guest Appearances:  Argentine-born Puerto Rican actor, model and previous judge of NBL Julian Gil, Cuban Actor Pedro Moreno & Argentine Actor Diego Olivera
Musical Guest: Colombian Reggaeton singer Maluma & Mexican singer and actress Thalía

Season 10, Episode 12: Up Close & Above  
Original Air Date—15 May 2016 The last  elimination and challenge take place as the eight All Star leaves the competition. The top 4  advance to the finale.

First Call-Out (At the Runway): Barbara Turbay
Nominees from Previous Week:   Barbara Turbay,  Catherine Castro,  Setareh Khatibi,  Ligia De Uriarte, and  Clarissa Molina
Eliminated from the Competition:  Ligia De Uriarte
All Star ★ NBL VIP Top 4:  Setareh Khatibi,  Barbara Turbay,  Clarissa Molina and  Catherine Castro
Musical Guest: Cuban reggaeton duo Gente de Zona , Colombian reggaeton singer & composer J Balvin & Mexican group Calibre 50

Season 10, Episode 13: All Star ★ NBL VIP is... 
All Star ★ NBL VIP Top 4: Setareh Khatibi,  Barbara Turbay,  Clarissa Molina,  Catherine Castro
All Star ★ NBL VIP winner:  Clarissa Molina
All Star ★ NBL VIP runner-up:  Setareh Khatibi
All Star ★ NBL VIP second runner-up:  Catherine Castro
All Star ★ NBL VIP third runner-up:  Barbara Turbay
Musical Guest: Puerto Rican reggaeton singer Wisin, Spanish musician,singer,and songwriter Pablo Alboran & Mexican singer and songwriter Julión Álvarez

Summaries
Call-out order

In episode 1, Group One formed by 14 semi-finalists was shown.
In episode 2, Group Two with the remainder of 26 the semi-finalists was shown. One quit reducing the contestants to 25.
In episode 3, the pool of 25 semi-finalists was reduced to the top 20 who moved on to the next round of the competition.
In episode 3, the pool of 20 semi-finalists was reduced to the top 13, with the first eleven making it to the competition.  
In episode 4, the final contestant in Top 12, chosen among the remaining two contestants, was announced. 

All★Stars
The following candidates are the top 26 "All Stars" Semi-Finalist Chosen to return:(12 contestants selected from different season will be chosen to compete)Participants selected to compete according to the order of their season and original season's rank

* Semi-Finalist,  Karol Scott representing NBL ★ 2012 (Season 6) was nominated to become the 12th contestant to participate but was eliminated in top 13. 
* Semi-Finalist,  Prissila Sanchez representing NBL ★ 2014 (Season 8) Quit the competition on second episode due to her pregnancy. She became ineligible to participate thus being eliminated.

Contestants nominated to fill the last two spots (25th & 26th) but did not make the final placing.(Participants selected to compete according to the order of their season and original season's rank)''

References 

Univision original programming
Nuestra Belleza Latina